Lasioglossum calceatum  is a Palearctic species of sweat bee.

References

External links
Images representing  Lasioglossum calceatum  

Hymenoptera of Europe
calceatum
Insects described in 1763
Taxa named by Giovanni Antonio Scopoli